Mark Gross may refer to:

 Mark Gross (mathematician) (born 1965), American mathematician
 Mark Gross (musician) (born 1966), American jazz saxophonist